Girlfriend is a 2010 American independent drama film written and directed by Justin Lerner.  The film stars newcomer Evan Sneider, along with Shannon Woodward, Amanda Plummer, Jackson Rathbone, Jerad Anderson, Darren MacDonald, and made its debut at the 2010 Toronto International Film Festival in Toronto, Ontario, Canada.

Plot
Evan is a young man with Down syndrome who lives with his mother, Celeste, in a working class, small town.  When he unexpectedly comes into a large amount of money, he uses it to romantically pursue a young mother, Candy, who is still entangled in her previous relationship with her abusive ex-boyfriend.

Cast
 Evan Sneider as Evan
 Shannon Woodward as Candy
 Amanda Plummer as Celeste
 Jackson Rathbone as Russ
 Jerad Anderson as Kenny
 Darren MacDonald as Darren Jones
 Rachel Melvin as Actress on Television (voice)
 Blake Berris as Actor on Television (voice)
 Daniel J. Turnbull as Andy Jones
 Harrison Lees as Harrison
 Joseph Turnbull as Willie Jones
 Seth Chatfield as Jeremy
 Nate Krawshuk as Simon
 Carole Helman as Janis
 Craig Wesley Divino as Keg Master

Production

Soundtrack
The film's original score features the work of 100 Monkeys, a band that includes the film's stars Jackson Rathbone and Jerad Anderson.

Release
Girlfriend premièred as an official selection at the 2010 Toronto International Film Festival, and then went on to play at the 2011 Festroia International Film Festival, 2011 Moscow International Film Festival, 2011 Galway Film Fleadh, and the 2011 Ghent International Film Festival.  The film also won the Jury Prize for Best Narrative Feature and the Audience Award at the 2011 Woods Hole Film Festival, Best Feature Film and Best Director at the 2011 White Sands International Film Festival, and the Audience Award for Best US Narrative Feature (in a tie with Pariah) at the 2011 Mill Valley Film Festival.

In November 2011, Girlfriend was awarded the Audience Award at the 2011 IFP Gotham Independent Film Awards.  This was the second year the Gotham Independent Film Audience Award was given out, 2010 being the first, when Waiting For Superman took the honor. The award kicked off the ceremony as the first of the evening, and was given to writer and director Justin Lerner and producers Jerad Anderson, Kristina Lauren Anderson, and Shaun O'Banion by actors Zachary Quinto and Sarah Paulson.

In April 2012, following the Gotham Independent Film Audience Award win, distributor Strand Releasing acquired the DVD and Video On Demand (VOD) rights to the film and released it on August 7, 2012.

Reception
The film has received mixed reviews. Rotten Tomatoes gives the film a score of 50% based on 10 reviews. Metacritic gives the film a rating of 42% based on reviews from 5 critics.

Ray Bennett from The Hollywood Reporter praised the film as "accomplished and tense" and wrote that first time actor Evan Sneider "handles scenes of tenderness, mystery, and anger with much skill. Shannon Woodward matches him."
John Anderson of Variety gave a mixed review but praised the chemistry between Evan Sneider and Amanda Plummer and also called Plummer's performance "quite brilliant."
Andrew O'Hehir wrote in Salon.com that the film "has tremendous heart and integrity" with an ending that is "gentle, optimistic, and just about right."

The New York Post gave the film two stars out of a possible four, stating that credit was due to "filmmaker Justin Lerner with getting an affecting performance out of Evan Sneider, a longtime friend with Down syndrome but no prior acting experience, in the emotionally manipulative and problematic melodrama Girlfriend."
The New York Times gave a mixed review saying that some events in the film were "melodramatic" and, "while not necessarily predictable" were not a "very surprising chain of events".
Slant Magazine gave the film a negative review with 1.5 stars out of a possible four and stated that "Girlfriend doesn't present us with anything life-affirming, challenging, or expectation-beating about a lead character with Down's. It's quite the opposite: The film at every turn wants us to feel increasingly worse for Evan" but admitted that the film seemed to "have its heart in the right place."

Awards and nominations

 2011, won Gotham Independent Film Audience Award
 2011, won Audience Award for 'Best U.S. Feature Film' at Mill Valley Film Festival (in a tie with Pariah (2011 film))
 2011, won Audience Award for 'Best of the Fest' at Woods Hole Film Festival
 2011, won Jury Award for 'Best Narrative Feature Film' at Woods Hole Film Festival
 2011, won 'Best Feature Film' at White Sands International Film Festival.
 2011, won 'Best Director' (Justin Lerner) at White Sands International Film Festival.

References

External links
 
 
 Girlfriend at Wayne/Lauren Film Company

2010 films
Down syndrome in film
Films shot in Massachusetts
American independent films
2010s English-language films
2010s American films